Chris Kavanagh (born 4 September 1985) is an English professional football referee from Ashton-under-Lyne, Greater Manchester. He officiates primarily in the Premier League having been promoted to the Select Group of Referees in 2017.

Career 

Kavanagh began his refereeing career at the age of 13. In 2012, he was promoted to officiate matches in the National League.

He began refereeing in the Football League in 2014. Kavanagh took charge of his first Premier League match in April 2017.

He was appointed to FIFA's international referees list in 2019.

He was the final appointed referee for the 2021 EFL Championship play-off Final between Brentford F.C and Swansea City AFC at Wembley Stadium on 29 May 2021.

References

1985 births
English football referees
Sportspeople from Ashton-under-Lyne
Sportspeople from Manchester
Living people
Premier League referees